Samuel Lindsey House is a historic home located at McClellandville, New Castle County, Delaware. It was built in the 1870s, and is a -story, Second Empire style brick dwelling with a mansard roof.  It has a five bay front facade and an original two story, brick wing extending from the rear elevation.  Built as a single dwelling, it has been converted into apartments at one time, and also used as a school.

It was added to the National Register of Historic Places in 1983.

References

Houses on the National Register of Historic Places in Delaware
Second Empire architecture in Delaware
Houses completed in 1875
Houses in New Castle County, Delaware
National Register of Historic Places in New Castle County, Delaware